The Women's Interstate Basketball Conference (WIBC) was the inaugural season of what would become the Australian Women's National Basketball League (WNBL).

History 
On 4 October 1980, during the Australian Women’s Club Championship in Sydney, a meeting of delegates from six of the leading clubs in Australian women’s basketball was held. The clubs were North Adelaide Rockets, West Adelaide Bearcats and Glenelg from South Australia and CYMS (Catholic Young Men's Society), Melbourne Telstars and St. Kilda Saints from Victoria.

The meeting resolved to form a two-round competition between these teams to be held in July and August in 1981. The basis for the idea was that many of the top sides in both states wanted a varied competition from their standard state leagues as well as a suitable preparation for the Australian Club Championship, which was held on an annual basis for the top 24 teams in the country. With the formation of the men's National Basketball League in 1979, the women felt that one of the best ways to develop the game was to provide more opportunities for the best players and clubs to play against each other more regularly.

A major consideration was finance and with this in mind the competition was formed with the six teams with a full home and away series between all teams with three games on one weekend to save costs. The New South Welsh teams of Bankstown Bruins and Sutherland Sharks were not happy due to costs and offered to pay their own way to Melbourne and Adelaide where they would play each team once for double points.

In 1981, the Australian Institute of Sport was also opened and the men's head coach Dr. Adrian Hurley contacted the clubs and asked whether the AIS could also participate in the competition to commence later that year.

The competition commenced on 19 June 1981 with the first game to be played in Adelaide between the AIS and West Adelaide Bearcats.

The competition was named the Women’s Interstate Basketball Conference with each the teams paying the sum of $25 to be a part of the WIBC – giving a central fund of $200 to conduct the competition.

Ladder 
The ladder at the end of the regular season.

Finals 

The inaugural winner was St. Kilda Saints defeating North Adelaide Rockets 77 points to 58. St. Kilda Saints also went on to win the Victorian State Championship and the Australian Club Championship in Melbourne defeating Bankstown Bruins in the final. St. Kilda Saints had three Australian representatives in Tracy Morris, Karen Ogden and Patricia Cockrem.

References 

https://web.archive.org/web/20120318214857/http://www.wnbl.com.au/fileadmin/user_upload/Media_Guide/2011_12/Team_Profiles/10041_BASKAUST_MEDIA_GUIDE_2011-12_WNBL_BACK.pdf

1981
1981 in Australian basketball
Aus
basketball